Clarence George Fallon ( – 11 January 1950) was an Australian trade unionist. He served as general secretary of the Australian Workers' Union (AWU) from 1941 to 1943. He was also president of the Australian Labor Party National Executive from 1938 to 1944.

Fallon died on 11 January 1950 at the Mater Hospital in North Sydney, New South Wales, having suffered a cerebral haemorrhage while attending an AWU Federal Council meeting. Fallon House in Bundaberg, Queensland, was named in his honour.

References

1890 births
1950 deaths
Australian trade unionists
Australian military personnel of World War I
Australian Labor Party officials
People from Central Queensland